Lajos Somodi Sr. (4 December 1928 – 9 May 2012) was a Hungarian foil fencer. He won a bronze medal in the team foil event at the 1956 Summer Olympics.

References

External links
 

1928 births
2012 deaths
Hungarian male foil fencers
Olympic fencers of Hungary
Fencers at the 1956 Summer Olympics
Olympic bronze medalists for Hungary
Olympic medalists in fencing
Medalists at the 1956 Summer Olympics